Anukriti Gusain (born 25 March 1994) is a former Miss India Grand International and an active social worker. She was crowned Miss Asia Pacific World India 2014 and represented India at Miss Asia Pacific World 2014 and Bride of the World India 2013. She made a comeback to pageantry in 2017, when she won Femina Miss India Uttarakhand 2017 and represented India in miss grand international in Vietnam.

Early life and education
Anukriti was born in Lansdowne of Pauri Garhwal district in north Indian state of Uttarakhand, She is from village Kandoli. She is the first of the three children of Uttam Singh Gusain and Narmada Devi. Anukriti has completed her schooling from Army Public School, Lansdowne. Then she graduated from DIT Dehradun pursued her Engineering from computer science. She unsuccessfully contested Uttarakhand Assembly election in 2022.

Career
 Executive Director Doon Institute of medical sciences Dehradun 2018 Present. 3 yrs 
 Joint CEO Ingreen nature's herb private limited 2018 Present • 3 yrs
 President Mahila Utthan Evam Bal Kalyan Sansthan (NGO) 2018 Present • 3 yrs
 Software Developer Cognizant (2017)
 Bennett Coleman and Co. Ltd. (Times Group) 1 yr 10 months.
 Miss Asia Pacific World India 2014
 Miss Grand International 2017

Femina Miss India
Femina Miss India Delhi 2013 was a regional pageant for participation Internationally. She won Femina Miss India Delhi 2013. She won two sub titles there including Femina Miss Timeless Beauty and Femina Miss Glowing Skin.

Gusain was one of the top five finalist of Femina Miss India 2013, which was held in Mumbai on 24 March 2013. Gusain has also titled with Miss Beautiful Smile and Miss Photogenic in Sub Contest Awards of Miss India 2013. Gusain is winner of Pond's Femina Miss India Delhi 2013, there were 14 finalists in the last round of Pond's Femina Miss India Delhi 2013. In addition to winning the competition, she also won PCJ Femina Miss Timeless Beauty and Pond's Femina Miss Glowing skin.

Miss Supertalent of the World
She was crowned Femina Miss India 2014 and represented India at Miss Supertalent of the World 2014 held at Grand Hilton Hotels in Seoul, Korea and was crowned the 4th Runner up. Gusain wore gold gowns, a cocktail sari and a bodysuit for the main event designed by Raakesh Agarvwal.

Miss Grand International 2017
Anukriti represented India at Miss Grand International 2017. She was considered as one of the top contenders for the pageant. Being consistent in all the activities, she won people's hearts. She was able to earn a spot in top 20 at the pageant which was held in Vietnam on 25 September 2017, but was not able to go further. Apart from this, she was a top 10 for best in national costume and swimsuit competition.

Awards
 She is awarded, Mahatma Gandhi Samman 2014 for representing India in international beauty pageant.
 Award from Uttarakhand Film Association to felicitated for her contribution in respective creative field.

Social work
 Her NGO is running several skill training centre to skill the women of Uttarakhand. The centre provide free skill training and entrepreneurship opportunities in various fields like food processing, general duty assistant, COVID CARE Frontline Workers, agriculture, mason tiling, floriculture, hospitality, etc. and has employed several people through these schemes.

Politics
She contested 2022 Uttarakhand Assembly elections on the ticket of Congress from Lansdowne constituency. She received a total of 14636 votes. She was defeated by Bhartiya Janta Party candidate Daleep Singh Rawat. Daleep received total 24504 votes.

TV shows

External links

References

External links

1994 births
Living people
Indian women television presenters
Indian television presenters
Female models from Uttarakhand
Indian beauty pageant winners
People from Pauri Garhwal district
Indian women engineers
Engineers from Uttarakhand
Women scientists from Uttarakhand
21st-century women engineers